Wentworth College is a college of the University of York, named after Thomas Wentworth, 1st Earl of Strafford.

History
The College was founded in 1972. Wentworth was refounded in 2001 and became the postgraduate only college of the University. Postgraduates can however choose membership of any of the colleges at the University. Wentworth College currently has around 500 resident graduate students and a further 4500 non-resident College Members.

When York Nightline was created in 1972, it was based in Wentworth College until it moved to Vanbrugh College in 1979.

Buildings and services
Wentworth houses the Department of Sociology, and the Vedge cafe (formerly the Edge), which is currently closed. The Graduate Common Room functions as a games room while the Senior Common Room is used for small formal and informal gatherings, including the Wentworth Seminar Series and the College Manager's afternoon tea. Other communal areas include a breakout room and a study space, as well as a lending library.

In addition, Wentworth has a computer room, a prayer room and a laundry room as well as an art and ceramics studio.

Student life
As a postgraduate only College Wentworth does not have a Junior Common Room, it does however have a Graduate Common Room and a Graduate Common Room Committee. All postgraduate students, whether members of Wentworth or not, are also represented by the Graduate Student Association. The College is a vibrant, academic and social community.

The 2023 GCRC Executive Committee is:

 Chair - Christian Bruegger and Veronika Lahodinski
 Treasurer - Eve Bray
 PGCR - Christian Bruegger 
 Events Officer - Veronika Lahodinski
 Diversity and Inclusion Representative - Roe Singal
 Events and Social Media Chair - Miten Shah
 Sustainability Officer - Eve Bray
 Health and Wellbeing Community Officer - Katie Patron

Provost
The current Principle of Wentworth College (formerly Provost) is Russell Yates.

List of Provosts of Wentworth College:
 Eric W Hawkins 1972-1975
Norman Rea 1975-1977
J Martin Bell 1978-1985
Peter M Lee 1985-2005
Carl A Thompson 2005-2010
Russell Yates 2010-present

References

External links 
University pages on Wentworth College

Colleges of the University of York
1972 establishments in England
Educational institutions established in 1972